Citerne is a French volcano located in Guadeloupe, on the southeast flank of La Grande Soufrière.

On the south edge of the crater there are radio and TV relay antennae. Citerne is located at the intersection of the communes of Gourbeyre (west), Capesterre-Belle-Eau (east) and Trois-Rivières (south); the three communes meet in Lac Flammarion, meaning that the mountain's summit is located within Gourbeyre. The entire mountain is within the Guadeloupe National Park. The summit is accessible from the north by the D11 (the final section of the route is closed to traffic), from the west by the Armistice trail, or from the south by another track.

The last eruption of Citerne occurred around 370.

References 

Volcanoes of Guadeloupe
Mountains of Guadeloupe
Dormant volcanoes